Friday Night may refer to:

Friday, evening

Friday Night may also refer to:

Art, entertainment, and media

Film
Friday Night (1987 film) (Petak vecher), a Bulgarian film by Lyudmil Kirkov
Friday Night (2000 film) (V petek zvecer), a Slovenian film
Friday Night (2002 film) (Vendredi soir), a French film by Claire Denis

Music
Friday Night (album), a 2016 album by Will Butler
"Friday Night" (Arabesque song), a song by Arabesque from 1978
"Friday Night" (Lady Antebellum song), was also recorded by Eric Paslay
"Friday Night" (Burak Yeter song), a 2019 song by Burak Yeter
"Friday Night", a song by Allister from Dead Ends and Girlfriends
"Friday Night", a song by the Click Five from Greetings from Imrie House
"Friday Night", a song by The Damned Things from Ironiclast, 2010
"Friday Night", a song by the Darkness from Permission to Land
"Friday Night", a song by Emil Bulls from The Southern Comfort
"Friday Night", a song by House of Heroes from House of Heroes
"Friday Night", a song by Lily Allen from Alright, Still
"Friday Night", a song by Loverboy from Lovin' Every Minute of It
"Friday Night", a song by McFly from the single "Sorry's Not Good Enough"/"Friday Night"
"Friday Night", a song by Redgum from Frontline
"Friday Night", a song by Roy Orbison from Laminar Flow
"Friday Night", a song by S Club 7 from S Club
"Friday Night", a song by Slick Shoes from Slick Shoes
"Friday Night", a song by Twenty 4 Seven
"Friday Night", a song by Timothy B. Schmit from Expando
"Friday Night", a song from the TV series The Kids from "Fame"
"Friday Night", a song by David Latour, remixed by Madeon
"Friday Night", a song by Dennis Wilson from Pacific Ocean Blue
"Friday Night", a song by Vandenberg from Heading for a Storm

Television
Friday Night with Jonathan Ross, a British TV chat show
Friday Night Videos or simply Friday Night, an American music video show
Friday Night! with Ralph Benmergui, a Canadian TV variety show
"Friday Night", an episode of Beavis and Butt-head
"Friday Night", an episode of Degrassi: The Next Generation

See also
Black Friday (disambiguation)

Friday Night Lights (disambiguation)
Good Friday
Thank God It's Friday (disambiguation)